The London Knights are a junior ice hockey team from London, Ontario, Canada, playing in the Ontario Hockey League, one of the leagues of the Canadian Hockey League. The Knights started out in 1965 as the London Nationals but changed to their current name in 1968.  The Knights have won two Memorial Cup championships.

History

Early days 
The London Nationals were granted a franchise in the OHA for the 1965–66 season under the ownership of the London Gardens arena, with the Toronto Maple Leafs controlling the team's players. Upon the collapse of the Metro Junior A League in 1963, the Leafs were left with only one sponsored OHA team, the Toronto Marlboros, with which to place their prospects. The team in London replaced the old Toronto St. Michael's Majors, who had folded a couple of years earlier. The Leafs originally wanted the Nationals to begin play in 1963–64, but it wasn't until a year later that the Nats became the Leafs' second team.

The Nationals were named for their sponsor, the Canadian National Recreation Association, an organization of Canadian National Railways employees, and took their uniforms as copies of those of the Maple Leafs, except for the words "London Nationals" spelled out on the Leaf instead of the familiar Toronto Maple Leafs script.

Brian Murphy played the most games for the Nationals, 98 in total over three seasons. Garry Unger led the team in career goals with 42 in only 50 games. Walt McKechnie was their all-time point leader with 26 goals, and 74 assists, totalling 100 points.

After three seasons, direct NHL sponsorship of junior teams ended. The team and Gardens was sold to businessman Howard Darwin for $500,000, who renamed the team to the Knights and changed the colours to green and gold.

The Darwin era: 1968–1986 
In 1968, businessman Howard Darwin bought the London Nationals (he also owned the Ottawa 67's) as the era of NHL sponsorship of junior hockey ended. Darwin wanted to give a fresh look to the team, and so held a contest to rename the team. Londoner Brian Logie suggested the name Knights, and the team's colours were changed to green, white and gold. In 1970 the team also hired trainer Don Brankley, who stayed with the team until retiring at the end of the 2007–08 season. The team grew from a chronic also-ran in the late 1960s and early 1970s to a contender near the end of the decade. The highlight of the Darwin era came in 1976–77, when a powerful Knights team led by future NHLers Rob Ramage, Brad Marsh and Dino Ciccarelli defeated the St. Catharines Fincups in the conference final on an overtime goal by Dan Eastman to advance to the OHL final against the 67's. However, the 67's were triumphant in six games in the league final. Following the retirement of long time head coach Bill Long following the 1979–80 season the franchise struggled to find success under new coach Paul McIntosh. Don Boyd was hired as McIntosh's replacement starting the 1983–84 season and the Knights fortunes began to improve. The Knights finished second in the Emms Division during the 1984–85 season lead by future NHL players Brian Bradley, Dave Lowry, Jeff Reese, Bob Halkidis and Jim Sandlak. Despite the team's depth, they were eliminated 3 games to 1 by the Hamilton Steelhawks in the second round of the playoffs. The following two seasons saw the team struggle under the newly hired head coach Wayne Maxner in spite of the emergence of future NHL star Brendan Shanahan. The 1985–86 team grabbed the final playoff spot in the Emms division during the last weekend of the regular season before exiting the playoffs 4-0-1 against the North Bay Centennials, while the 1986–87 Knights failed to qualify for the playoffs.

New Owners, new dawn: 1986–1994 
In 1986 Howard Darwin sold the Knights and the arena to Paris, Ontario businessmen Jack Robillard, Al Martin and Bob Willson. The trio also owned the Hamilton Steelhawks. The Knights were sold for a dollar but the London Gardens was sold at market value. The new ownership group modified the team's logo, which incorporated black into the color scheme and renovated the Gardens. Under their stewardship the Knights would go on a run of success. Between 1987 and 1993 the team would finish no lower than third in the Emms Division, including a division title in 1989–90. However, regular season success did not translate into playoff success, as the Knights would never make the league final in these years.

"Knightmare" and redemption: 1994–2000 
In 1994 the Knights were sold to St. Thomas, Ontario, real estate developer Doug Tarry Sr. He died before the team had played a game under his ownership, and the team was inherited by his son, Doug Tarry Jr. Upon taking command, Tarry carried out further renovations on the Gardens including a name change to the "London Ice House."  He also alienated a fair portion of the team's fan base by changing the team's colours from green, gold and black to eggplant and teal, and changing the logo to a cartoon logo instantly and derisively nicknamed "Spiderknight" by the faithful.

The Knights' 1995–96 OHL season went down as the worst in the history of the Canadian Hockey League. The Knights finished the season with only nine points and a 3–60–3 record. The years following the so-called "Knightmare" season were improved, but the team was still a long way from the league's upper echelon. Meanwhile, the Ice House was falling apart as the Tarry family had stopped putting money into it as a part of their lobbying the city of London for a new arena. However, the re-signing of former Head Coach Gary Agnew, and the signing of future NHLers Rico Fata and Tom Kostopoulos heralded a marked turnaround for the team's fortunes. In 1999, the Knights went on an unexpected playoff run, in which they defeated the number-one-in-the-CHL Plymouth Whalers in seven games in the quarterfinals and ultimately went all the way to the OHL championship, which they lost in seven games to the Belleville Bulls.

The Hunter era: 2000–present 
In 2000, former NHL players Dale Hunter, Mark Hunter and Basil McRae bought the Knights from Doug Tarry Jr. The sale was brokered by George Georgopoulos, who was negotiating with the city of London for the development of a state of the art multipurpose entertainment centre and arena – the John Labatt Centre. The Hunters began the process of rebuilding by firstly joining in the lobbying for a new 9,900 seat arena in Downtown London and putting together a smart scouting network. The Ice House was scheduled to be sold and closed at the conclusion of the 2001–02 OHL season, and the Knights changed back to the 1986–94 green, gold and black colour scheme in February 2002. In October that year the Labatt Centre opened, and new uniforms featuring black as the dominate color debuted.

The 2003–04 OHL season would mark the beginning of a remarkable dynasty. The Knights had the best regular season record in the CHL and set an OHL record with 110 points, but lost the OHL Western Conference final to the Guelph Storm. In the 2004–05 season, the Knights set a new CHL record by going 31 games in a row without a loss (29–0–2). The previous record of 29 games, held by the 1978–79 Brandon Wheat Kings (who went 25–0–4 during their streak), was broken with a 0–0 tie against the Guelph Storm on December 10, 2004. The streak ended at 31 games after a 5–2 loss to the Sudbury Wolves on December 17. The Knights finished the season with 120 points (59 wins, 7 losses, 2 ties), breaking their own OHL record set the previous season. In the playoffs, the Knights started by sweeping two best-of-seven series against the Guelph Storm and Windsor Spitfires. In the Western Conference final, the Knights defeated the Kitchener Rangers 4–1 to win the Wayne Gretzky Trophy. In the OHL finals against the Ottawa 67's, the Knights won the series 4–1 to win their first J. Ross Robertson Cup, ending the longest championship drought in the CHL. That same year, the London Knights and the John Labatt Centre (renamed Budweiser Gardens in 2012) were awarded the right to host 2005 Memorial Cup Tournament, which was played from May 21 to May 29. In the tournament, they defeated the Rimouski Océanic 4–3 on May 21, the Kelowna Rockets 4–2 on May 23, and the Ottawa 67's 5–2 on May 26. This earned the Knights a bye into the championship game. On May 29, the Knights defeated Rimouski 4–0 to win their first Memorial Cup. In 2005–06, the team won their third consecutive Hamilton Spectator Trophy for winning the regular season title, but their run into the playoffs ended with a loss to Peterborough in the OHL final. In 2006–07 the Knights continued their run of success, winning their fourth consecutive Hamilton Spectator Trophy as regular season champions. However, they lost the Western Conference Championship to the Plymouth Whalers.

On January 9, 2009, the London Knights made a blockbuster trade. They acquired future number one pick in the 2009 NHL draft, John Tavares, from the Oshawa Generals. The Knights also received defenceman Michael Del Zotto and goaltender Darryl Borden. In return, the Generals received defenceman Scott Valentine, forward Christian Thomas, goaltender Michael Zador, four second-round draft picks (2009–12) and two third-round picks (2010–11). After a strong 2009–10 season, the Knights decided to turn to young players for the 2010–11 season. They traded several veterans for future draft picks throughout the season, and at the deadline in hopes of re-building another contender.

On November 28, 2011, Dale Hunter resigned as head coach to become head coach of his former NHL team, the Washington Capitals. Brother Mark Hunter assumed the coaching helm. Under Mark's guidance, the Knights won their second OHL title in 2011–12, defeating the Niagara IceDogs four games to one in the league final and advancing to the 2012 Memorial Cup. The Knights finished the round robin in first place, but lost in the championship final 2–1 in overtime to the host Shawinigan Cataractes.

Despite a successful season in Washington — coaching the struggling Capitals to the playoffs and an upset of the defending Stanley Cup champion Boston Bruins in the first round before being eliminated by the New York Rangers — Dale Hunter announced on May 14, 2012, he would not return to coach the Capitals in the 2012–13 season, choosing instead to return to the London Knights.

With Hunter once again behind the bench, the Knights continued their winning ways in the 2012–13 season, handily leading the league with 105 points in the regular season en route to their second-straight Hamilton Spectator Trophy. They then cruised through the first three rounds of the playoffs, defeating the Saginaw Spirit, Kitchener Rangers and Plymouth Whalers in four, five and five games respectively. The Knights capped their OHL season with a thrilling game seven win over the Barrie Colts as Bo Horvat scored the game-winning goal in the last second of the third period to capture the Knights' second consecutive J. Ross Robertson Cup. At the 2013 Memorial Cup the Knights finished 1–2 in the round robin, forcing them to play a tie-breaker against the host Saskatoon Blades. Though the Knights handily defeated the Blades 6–1, they lost to the Portland Winterhawks 2–1 in the semifinal.

London finished the 2013–14 season third in the OHL with 103 regular season points. However, the only two teams above them were their division opponents, the Guelph Storm and Erie Otters, thus denying the Knights a third straight division title. After sweeping the Windsor Spitfires in the first round the Knights were eliminated by the Storm in five games. Nevertheless, the Knights earned a berth in the 2014 Memorial Cup, their third straight, by virtue of being selected to host the tournament the day after winning the OHL championship the year before. Faced with stiff competition, the Knights finished last in the round robin and were eliminated from the tournament.

On October 21, 2014, Mark Hunter resigned as Knights general manager after being appointed director of player personnel for the Toronto Maple Leafs. Basil McRae succeeded Hunter as GM, though Hunter retained his ownership interest in the Knights and continued as vice president of the team.

The 2014–15 season was a rebuilding for the Knights. Despite this, the team finished second in the Midwest division and made it to the second round of the playoffs before being swept by the Erie Otters.

A renewed and powerful Knights team finished the 2015–16 season tied with the Erie Otters for the league lead with 105 points, but were denied the Hamilton Spectator Trophy by virtue of a tiebreaker. In the first round of the playoffs the Owen Sound Attack forced a sixth game before the Knights finished them off and began a thirteen-game winning streak, sweeping the Kitchener Rangers, Erie Otters and Niagara IceDogs en route to their third OHL championship and fourth Memorial Cup appearance in five seasons. The Knights entered the 2016 Memorial Cup as favourites due to their impressive winning streak and did not disappoint, dominating the round robin and outscoring their opponents by a combined score of 20–5. In the championship game, the Knights faced off against the CHL number-one ranked Rouyn-Noranda Huskies. The Huskies pushed the Knights to the limit, carrying a 2–1 lead late into the third period before Christian Dvorak scored with 4:11 remaining to force overtime, where a goal by Matthew Tkachuk earned the Knights their 17th-straight win and second Memorial Cup championship.

Championships
The London Knights have won the Memorial Cup tournament two times, won the J. Ross Robertson Cup four times, won the Western Conference six times, and have won fifteen division titles.

Memorial Cup (CHL champions)
2004–05 Champions vs. Rimouski Océanic
2011–12 Lost to Shawinigan Cataractes
2012–13 Finished 3rd place
2013–14 Finished 4th place
2015–16 Champions vs. Rouyn-Noranda Huskies

J. Ross Robertson Cup (OHL champions)
1976–77 Lost to Ottawa 67's
1998–99 Lost to Belleville Bulls
2004–05 Champions vs. Ottawa 67's
2005–06 Lost to Peterborough Petes
2011–12 Champions vs. Niagara IceDogs
2012–13 Champions vs. Barrie Colts
2015–16 Champions vs. Niagara IceDogs

Hamilton Spectator Trophy (Most points in regular reason)
2003–04 – 110 points – 53–11–2–2
2004–05 – 120 points – 59–7–2–0
2005–06 – 102 points – 49–15–1–3
2006–07 – 104 points – 50–14–1–3
2011–12 – 99 points – 49–18–0–1
2012–13 – 105 points – 50–13–2–3

Wayne Gretzky Trophy (Western Conference champions)
1998–99
2004–05
2005–06
2011–12
2012–13
2015–16

Division trophies
1977–78 – Emms Division
1989–90 – Emms Division
1997–98 – West Division
2003–04 – Midwest Division
2004–05 – Midwest Division
2005–06 – Midwest Division
2006–07 – Midwest Division
2008–09 – Midwest Division
2009–10 – Midwest Division
2011–12 – Midwest Division
2012–13 – Midwest Division
2018–19 – Midwest Division
2019–20 – Midwest Division
2021–22 – Midwest Division
2022–23 – Midwest Division

Awards

Canadian Hockey League

CHL Player of the Year
1981–82 – Dave Simpson
1993–94 – Jason Allison
2015–16 – Mitch Marner

Ed Chynoweth Trophy
Top Scorer at the Memorial Cup
2016 - Mitch Marner

George Parsons Trophy
Most Sportsmanlike Player at the Memorial Cup
2013 – Bo Horvat

Hap Emms Memorial Trophy
Outstanding Goaltender at the Memorial Cup
2005 – Adam Dennis
2016 - Tyler Parsons

Stafford Smythe Memorial Trophy
Most Valuable Player at the Memorial Cup
2005 – Corey Perry
2016 – Mitch Marner

Brian Kilrea Coach of the Year Award
2003–04 – Dale Hunter

CHL Executive of the Year
1997–98 – Paul McIntosh

CHL Defenceman of the Year
2004–05 – Danny Syvret

CHL Goaltender of the Year
2011–12 – Michael Houser

CHL Humanitarian of the Year
1997–98 – Jason Metcalfe

CHL Rookie of the Year
2006–07 – Patrick Kane

CHL Top Draft Prospect Award
2006–07 – Patrick Kane
2008–09 – John Tavares

CHL Top Scorer Award
1993–94 – Jason Allison
2006–07 – Patrick Kane

Ontario Hockey League

Bobby Smith Trophy
Scholastic Player of the Year
1981–82 – Dave Simpson

Dan Snyder Memorial Trophy
Humanitarian of the Year
1998 – Jason Metcalfe

Dave Pinkney Trophy
Lowest Team G.A.A.
2003–04 – Ryan MacDonald & Gerald Coleman
2004–05 – Adam Dennis & Gerald Coleman
2015–16 – Brendan Burke & Tyler Parsons

Eddie Powers Memorial Trophy
Top Scorer
1981–82 – Dave Simpson
1993–94 – Jason Allison
2004–05 – Corey Perry
2005–06 – Rob Schremp
2006–07 – Patrick Kane
2008–09 – John Tavares

Emms Family Award
Rookie of the Year
1972–73 – Dennis Maruk
1987–88 – Rick Corriveau
2000–01 – Rick Nash
2006–07 – Patrick Kane

F.W. "Dinty" Moore Trophy
Lowest G.A.A. among Rookie Goaltenders
1976–77 – Barry Heard
1989–90 – Sean Basilio
2003–04 – Ryan MacDonald
2017–18 – Jordan Kooy
2019–20 – Brett Brochu

Jack Ferguson Award
Top Draft Pick
1996 – Rico Fata

Jim Mahon Memorial Trophy
Highest Scoring Right Winger
1972–73 – Dennis Ververgaert
1977–78 – Dino Ciccarelli
1997–98 – Maxim Spiridonov
2003–04 – Corey Perry
2004–05 – Corey Perry
2005–06 – Dave Bolland
2006–07 – Patrick Kane
2012–13 – Seth Griffith
2014–15 – Mitch Marner

Matt Leyden Trophy
Coach of the Year
1976–77 – Bill Long
1992–93 – Gary Agnew
1997–98 – Gary Agnew
2003–04 – Dale Hunter
2004–05 – Dale Hunter
2009–10 – Dale Hunter

Max Kaminsky Trophy
Most Outstanding Defenseman
1975–76 – Rick Green
1977–78 – Brad Marsh and Rob Ramage
1984–85 – Bob Halkidis
1999–00 – John Erskine
2004–05 – Danny Syvret
2018–19 – Evan Bouchard

Mickey Renaud Captain's Trophy
Team Captain that Best Exemplifies Leadership
2014-15 – Max Domi

OHL Executive of the Year
1997–98 – Paul McIntosh
2003–04 – Mark Hunter

OHL Goaltender of the Year
2005–06 – Adam Dennis
2006–07 – Steve Mason
2011–12 – Michael Houser

Red Tilson Trophy
Most Outstanding Player
1974–75 – Dennis Maruk
1981–82 – Dave Simpson
1993–94 – Jason Allison
2004–05 – Corey Perry
2011–12 – Michael Houser
2015–16 – Mitch Marner

Roger Neilson Memorial Award
Top Academic College/University Player
2007–08 – Scott Aarssen

Wayne Gretzky 99 Award
Playoffs MVP
2005 – Corey Perry
2012 – Austin Watson
2013 – Bo Horvat
2016 – Mitch Marner

William Hanley Trophy
Most Sportsmanlike Player
1981–82 – Dave Simpson
1993–94 – Jason Allison

Coaches
The London Nationals were coached by Jack McIntyre for the 1965–66 season. For their second and third seasons from 1966 to 1968, the Nationals were coached by Hockey Hall of Fame goaltender Turk Broda.

London Knights coaches have won the Matt Leyden Trophy, emblematic of the OHL's Coach of the Year, five times. Bill Long won it once, in 1976–77, Gary Agnew twice, in 1992–93 and in 1997–98, and Dale Hunter twice, in 2003–04 and 2004–05. Dale Hunter also won the Brian Kilrea Coach of the Year Award, emblematic of CHL Coach of the Year honours, in 2003–04.

As London Nationals:
1965–1966 — Jack McIntyre
1966–1968 — Turk Broda
As London Knights:

Notes: Mike Fedorko was entering his second season as Knights' coach and GM in the autumn of 1995. He was fired in October 1995 when the Knights began the season with a 13-game losing streak. Assistant Murray Nystrom took over coaching duties temporarily. Tom Barrett, who had led the Kitchener Rangers to the 1984 Memorial Cup, was named head coach in December. Barrett died of cancer in April 1996, shortly after the conclusion of the season. Moe Mantha was originally named the head coach to take over from Barrett, but left to coach the Baltimore Bandits of the American Hockey League before coaching a game. Brad Selwood was ultimately named Barrett's replacement for 1996–97 but was fired mid-season and GM Paul McIntosh took over on an interim basis for the rest of the season. Gary Agnew was rehired at the start of 1997–98.

Players

NHL or WHA alumni
The following is a complete list of London Knights who later played in the National Hockey League or World Hockey Association.

London Nationals

London Knights

First round picks in NHL or WHA drafts
The London Knights have produced more first overall selections in the NHL Entry Draft (5) than any other team in the world. The Knights also produced one first overall selection in the 1977 WHA Amateur Draft (Scott Campbell by the Houston Aeros), who started his professional career in that league. London is also ranked third (behind Peterborough and Oshawa) on the all-time list of number of players drafted by the NHL, with 142 as of 2007.

The following players were selected in the first round of the NHL entry draft:

The following players were selected in the first round of the WHA amateur draft:
Reg Thomas – 1973, 8th overall by the Los Angeles Sharks
Rick Green – 1976, 10th overall by the Quebec Nordiques
Scott Campbell – 1977, 1st overall by the Houston Aeros

Retired numbers
List of numbers retired by the London Knights.
5 – Rob Ramage
8 – Dino Ciccarelli
9 – Darryl Sittler
19 – Brendan Shanahan
22 – Brad Marsh
61 – Rick Nash
88 – Patrick Kane
91 – Dave Bolland
94 – Corey Perry

Hall of Famers
List of London Knights players in the Hockey Hall of Fame.
Dino Ciccarelli
Brendan Shanahan
Darryl Sittler

Season-by-season results

Legend: GP = Games played, W = Wins, L = Losses, T = Ties, OTL = Overtime losses, SL = Shoot-out losses, Pts = Points, GF = Goals for, GA = Goals against

Notes

Arenas 

The London Gardens was built in 1963 and served as the home of the Knights from the team's inception in 1965 to its closing in 2002. The building was renamed London Ice House in 1994. The Knights final game played at the arena was in the 2002 playoffs, where the Knights lost in overtime in the sixth game of the second round to the eventual OHL Champion Erie Otters. The Knights used the Ice House for their training camp and exhibition schedule for the 2002–03 season and moved out permanently in October 2002.

The Budweiser Gardens opened on October 11, 2002 as the Knights played host to the Plymouth Whalers. The arena, located in downtown London, is the largest in Western Ontario. Tickets for the 2005–06 season in the building sold out in one day, and there is currently a cap on season tickets due to the team's popularity.

See also
List of ice hockey teams in Ontario

References

External links
Official website

 
Ontario Hockey League teams
Ice hockey clubs established in 1965
Toronto Maple Leafs minor league affiliates
1965 establishments in Ontario